Shinai (竹刀) is a weapon used for practice and competition in kendo representing a Japanese sword. 

Shinai may also refer to:
 Shinai, Kutch, a village near Anjar, Kutch, Gujarat, India
"Shin'ai" (深愛), a 2009 single by Nana Mizuki

See also
Shin'ai Naru Mono e, 1979 album by Miyuki Nakajima